Katumbo (Dance) is an album by American trumpeter Johnny Coles recorded in 1971 for the Mainstream label.

Reception

AllMusic awarded the album 3 stars.

Track listing
 "Never Can Say Goodbye" (Clifton Davis) - 3:01  
 "The September of My Years" (Jimmy Van Heusen, Sammy Cahn) - 5:29  
 "728" (Johnny Coles) - 7:17  
 "Petits Machins" (Miles Davis, Gil Evans) - 3:41  
 "Betty's Bossa" (Cecil Bridgewater) - 4:28  
 "Funk Dumplin'" (Coles) - 6:49

Personnel 
Johnny Coles - trumpet, flugelhorn
Astley Fennell - trombone
Howard Johnson - tuba
Gregory Herbert - tenor saxophone
Cedar Walton - piano, electric piano
Reggie Workman - electric bass
Bruce Ditmas - drums

References 

1971 albums
Johnny Coles albums
Mainstream Records albums
Albums produced by Bob Shad